This topic lists the Racquetball events for 2018.

World and Continental Events
 March 23 – 31: 2018 Pan American Racquetball Championships in  Temuco
 Men's Singles:  Carlos Keller Vargas defeated  David Horn, 15–12, 5–15, 11–7.
 Women's Singles:  Rhonda Rajsich defeated  Paola Longoria, 15–3, 14–15, 11–7.
 Men's Doubles:  Rodrigo Montoya &  Álvaro Beltrán defeated  Conrado Moscoso &  Carlos Keller Vargas, 13–15, 15–10, 11–6.
 Women's Doubles:  Paola Longoria &  Alexandra Herrera defeated  Ana Gabriela Martínez &  María Renee Rodriguez, 9–15, 15–1, 11–8.

International Racquetball Tour
September 7, 2017 –: International Racquetball Tour

 September 7 – 10: 2017 Phase IV Scientific Health & Performance Pro Am in  Canoga Park
 Singles:  Kane Waselenchuk defeated  Rocky Carson, 11-0, 11-2, 11-4.
 Doubles:  Ben Croft &  Kane Waselenchuk defeated  Álvaro Beltrán &  Daniel de la Rosa, 15-5, 15-13.
 Futures:  Andree Parrilla defeated  David Horn, 11-6, 11-6, 11-9.
 October 4 – 8, 2017: US Open Racquetball Championships in  Minneapolis
 Singles:  Kane Waselenchuk defeated  Rocky Carson, 11-6, 11-4, 8-11, 11-4.
 Doubles:  Ben Croft &  Kane Waselenchuk defeated  Álvaro Beltrán &  Daniel de la Rosa, 15-10, 10-15, 11-7.
 November 2 – 5, 2017: Creatix – Atlanta IRT Pro Am in  Atlanta
 Singles:  Kane Waselenchuk defeated  Rocky Carson. Rocky Carson retired due injury.
 Doubles:  Álvaro Beltrán &  Daniel de la Rosa defeated  Jake Bredenbeck &  Jose Diaz, 15-8, 15-2.
 November 16 – 19, 2017: St. Louis IRT Pro Racquetball Winter Rollout in  Saint Louis
 Singles:  Kane Waselenchuk defeated  Rocky Carson, 11-1, 11-3, 11-4.
 Doubles Futures:  Jake Bredenbeck &  David Horn defeated  Felipe Camacho &  Samuel Murray, 12-15, 15-8, 11-8.
 November 30 – December 3, 2017: Portland Tournament of Champions  Portland
 Singles:  Charles Pratt defeated  Mario Mercado. Mario Mercado retired due injury.
 Doubles Futures:  Felipe Camacho &  Samuel Murray defeated  Adam Manilla &  Nicholas Riffel, 15-4, 15-7.
 January 5 – 7: 2018 IRT Los Angeles Open in  Canoga Park
 Singles:  Daniel de la Rosa defeated  Kane Waselenchuk. Kane Waselenchuk forfeits due to an injury picked up in the semi-finals.
 Doubles:  Alejandro Landa &  Samuel Murray defeated  Jake Bredenbeck &  Jose Diaz, 15-14, 14-15, 11-9.
 January 18 – 21: Lewis Drug Pro/Am in  Sioux Falls, South Dakota
 Singles:  Alejandro Landa defeated  Daniel de la Rosa, 15-6, 7-15, 11-10.
 Singles IRT Futures:  Sebastian Franco defeated  Alejandro Cardona, 9-15, 15-13, 11-9.
 Doubles:  Javier Mar &  Rodrigo Montoya defeated  Jake Bredenbeck &  Jose Diaz, 15-13, 15-12.
 Doubles IRT Futures:  Eduardo Portillo &  Sebastian Fernandez defeated  Tim Landeryou &  James Landeryou, 15-11, 10-15, 11-7.
 March 1 – 4: San Antonio March Madness in  San Antonio
 Singles:  Tyler Panozzo defeated  Thirumurugan Thyagarajan, 12-15, 15-4, 11-6.
 Doubles IRT Futures:  Jose Diaz &  Samuel Murray defeated  Felipe Camacho &  Alejandro Landa, WBF - No Show.
 March 15 – 18: The 33rd Annual Shamrock Shootout and IRT Pro Stop in  Chicago
 Singles:  Andree Parrilla defeated  David Horn, 15-1, 15-9.
 Doubles:  Sebastian Franco &  Mario Mercado defeated  Alejandro Landa &  Samuel Murray, WBF - No Show.
 April 5 – 8: Mercedes-Benz of Ft. Mitchell Raising Some Racquet For Kids in  Cincinnati
 Singles:  Alejandro Landa defeated  Álvaro Beltrán, 11-15, 15-7, 11-8.
 April 26 – 29: Florida IRT Regional Championships in  Sarasota
 Singles:  Kane Waselenchuk defeated  Rocky Carson, 15-5, 15-4.
 May 2 – 6: World Doubles Open Championships in  Denver (final)
 Men's Doubles:  Ben Croft &  Kane Waselenchuk defeated  Álvaro Beltrán &  Daniel de la Rosa, WBF - Injury.
 Mixed Doubles:  Daniel De La Rosa &  Michelle De La Rosa defeated  Adriana Riveros &  Mario Mercado, 15-7, 15-13.

Ladies Professional Racquetball Tour
 August 18, 2017 – May 27: 2017–18 Ladies Professional Racquetball Tour
 August 18 – 20, 2017: Paola Longoria Experience in  San Luis Potosí City
 Singles:  Paola Longoria defeated  Jessica Parrilla, 11-7, 11-5, 11-0.
 Doubles:  Paola Longoria &  Monserrat Mejía defeated  Adriana Riveros &  Cristina Amaya, 15-8, 15-14.
 August 23 – 27, 2017: Torneo Milenio LPRT 2017 Racquetbol in  Tijuana
 Singles:  Paola Longoria defeated  Alexandra Herrera, 11-4, 11-3, 11-0.
 Doubles:  Alexandra Herrera &  Natalia Méndez defeated  Carla Muñoz &  Jessica Parrilla, 10-15, 15-15, 11-10.
 September 21 – 24, 2017: 3Wallball World Championships in  Las Vegas
 Singles:  Janel Tisinger defeated  Rhonda Rajsich, 11-15, 15-10, 11-8.
 Doubles:  Aimee Ruiz &  Janel Tisinger defeated  Michelle Poage &  Jackie Paraiso, 15-11, 15-9.
 October 4 – 8, 2017: US Open Racquetball Championships in  Minneapolis
 Singles:  Paola Longoria defeated  Frédérique Lambert, 11-7, 11-4, 2-11, 11-3.
 Doubles:  Gabriela Martínez &  Paola Longoria defeated  Adriana Riveros &  Cristina Amaya, 15-5, 15-8.
 October 27 – 29: The Boston Open in  Boston
 Singles:  Paola Longoria defeated  Frédérique Lambert. Frédérique Lambert retired due injury.
 Doubles:  Alexandra Herrera &  Paola Longoria defeated  Adriana Riveros &  Cristina Amaya, 15-5, 15-9.
 December 8 – 10: The Christmas Classic in  Laurel
 Singles:  Paola Longoria defeated  Frédérique Lambert, 11-2, 11-0, 9-11, 11-2.
 Doubles:  Alexandra Herrera &  Paola Longoria defeated  Frédérique Lambert &  Jessica Parrilla, 15-13, 15-6.
 January 26 – 28: Sweet Caroline Open in  Greenville, South Carolina
 Singles:  Paola Longoria defeated  Nancy Enríquez, 11-9, 11-7, 11-0.
 Doubles:  Alexandra Herrera &  Paola Longoria defeated  Frédérique Lambert &  Samantha Salas, 15-13, 15-5.
 Mixed Pro:  Jordan Walters &  Carla Muñoz defeated  Sheryl Lotts &  Shane Karmelin, 15-13, 14-15, 11-3.
 March 9 – 11: 2018 LPRT Peachtree Open in  Atlanta
 Singles:  María José Vargas defeated  Frédérique Lambert, WBF - No Show.
 Doubles:  Adriana Riveros &  Cristina Amaya defeated  María José Vargas &  Natalia Mendez, 12-15, 15-9, 11-9.
 Mixed Pro:  Rhonda Rajsich &  Ben Croft defeated  Sharon Jackson &  Allan Crockett, 10-15, 15-9, 11-2.
 March 23 – 26: New York Life Insurance Beach Bash in  Hollywood Beach
 Women's Singles One Wall:  Hollie Scott defeated  Michelle Herbert, 21-6.
 Women's Doubles One Wall:  Michelle Herbert &  Hollie Scott defeated  Susan Stephen &  Melissa Santiago. Match not played.
 April 20 – 22: Battle At The Alamo in  San Antonio
 Men's Singles:  Daniel De La Rosa defeated  Andree Parrilla, 15-14, 15-12.
 Women's Singles:  Samantha Salas defeated  Paola Longoria, 5-11, 5-11, 11-9, 11-9, 11-4.
 Women's Doubles:  Paola Longoria &  Samantha Salas defeated  Alexandra Herrera &  Monserrat Mejia, 15-6, 15-2.
 May 4 – 6: World Open Doubles Championships in  Denver
 Women's Doubles:  Paola Longoria &  Samantha Salas defeated  Alexandra Herrera &  Monserrat Mejia, 15-5, 5-15, 11-6.
 May 23 – 27: US National Singles in  Pleasanton
 Women's Singles:  Rhonda Rajsich defeated  Kelani Bailey, 15-9, 15-7.
 June 8 – 10: The Teamroot.com Classic in  Overland Park (final)
 Singles:  Paola Longoria defeated  Frédérique Lambert, 11-6, 6-11, 11-4, 11-2.
 Doubles:  Paola Longoria &  Samantha Salas defeated  María José Vargas &  Natalia Mendez, 15-13, 15-6.

References

External links
 International Racquetball Federation

 
Racquetball by year
racquetball
2018 sport-related lists